The Cajatambo Province is one of nine provinces in the Lima Region of Peru. It is bordered to the north by the Ancash Region, to the east by the Huánuco Region, to the south by the Oyón Province, and to the west by the Huaura Province.

Overview
From 1851 to 1916 Cajatambo was part of Ancash Region and also included the areas of Bolognesi Province and Ocros Province, which remained in that region. Bolognesi, including Ocros until 1990, split from Cajatambo in 1903; in 1916 Cajatambo was given to Lima Region.

Geography 
The Waywash mountain range traverses the province. Some of the highest mountains of the province are listed below:

Administrative divisions
The province is divided into five districts:
 Cajatambo
 Copa
 Gorgor
 Huancapón
 Manas

Population
The province has a population of approximately 10,000 people.

Capital
The capital of the province is the city of Cajatambo.

Industry
Historically, the principal products of the province have been cattle and sheep, although cochineal is also produced in the area.

See also
 Quyllurqucha

References

External links
  www.cajatambo.com

Provinces of the Lima Region